Sarah Esther Satterfield (born 1946) is an American jazz singer. She is best known as the vocalist for the title songs of Chuck Mangione's albums Land of Make Believe (1973) and Chase the Clouds Away (1975).

Satterfield recorded and toured with Mangione during the 1970s, and released two solo albums, Once I Loved (1974) and Need to Be (1976), both produced by Chuck Mangione.

References

External links
https://www.allmusic.com/artist/esther-satterfield-mn0000204652/credits (The New York Times, Sept. 9, 1979)
https://www.washingtonpost.com/archive/lifestyle/1982/03/17/the-many-voices-of-esther-satterfield/e0fdebe7-8fd8-4792-80f5-e02e2bfbeaf5/ (Washington Post, March 17, 1982)

American women jazz singers
American jazz singers
Living people
1946 births
20th-century American women singers
20th-century American singers
21st-century American women